Glyptothorax kudremukhensis is a species of catfish in family Sisoridae and was described by K.C. Gopi in 2007. It is endemic to the Western Ghats and only known from the Tunga River from inside the Kudremukh National Park. IUCN categorises the species as critically endangered. No subspecies are listed in the Catalogue of Life.

References 

Glyptothorax
Endemic fauna of the Western Ghats
Freshwater fish of India
Catfish of Asia
Taxa named by Koottala Chakkappan Gopi
Fish described in 2007